Ian Mobsby is a writer, speaker and missioner.  He is the elected Guardian of the Society of the Holy Trinity, Assistant Dean for Fresh Expressions and Pioneer Ministry in the Diocese of Southwark and the Rector of Christchurch Blackfriars in London  and the Canon for Mission Theology for the Diocese of Niagara  Mobsby is the former Priest in Charge of the Guild Church of St Mary Aldermary in the City of London and the former missioner to the Moot Community. Mobsby has a background in the Emerging Church and in particular New Monasticism and as an associate missioner of the Fresh expression Initiative. He is completing PhD ethnographic and theological research exploring the spiritual but not religious as a social grouping through the Archbishop's Examination in Theology.

Biography

Early life and education 
Mobsby was born in the heady days of the late 1960s, with a family inheritance of atheism and socialism on his mother's side and science, the arts and banking on his father's side. At an early age he took to music, which became a key motif to his life, particularly with the classical guitar and violin.  He also had a love of nature and has described in his writing how this opened up the experience of spirituality in nature.  He trained for a BHSc (Hons) in occupational therapy at York St John University which was formally part of the University of Leeds at the time.

It was while studying in York that Mobsby became a committed Christian, largely through an alternative worship project then called Warehouse and now called Visions.

Vocation and ministry 
Mobsby completed an MA in Pastoral Theology validated by Anglia Ruskin University and taught through the Cambridge University's Cambridge Theological Federation part-time whilst still working split between Occupational Therapy and working as a lay pioneer. At the end of training, he was released from the Southwark diocese to be involved in forming a new missional and fresh expression of church at the Church of England church called St Matthew's Westminster in the Diocese of London. He was ordained by the Bishop of London to serve a training title with St Matthew's, Westminster and the Moot Community. In the second year of his curacy and work with Moot, Mobsby met with the new Archbishop's Missioner the then Revd Steven Croft now Bp of Oxford, where he was formally invited to become an Associate Missioner of the new Fresh Expressions initiative.  At the same time Mobsby completed his MA research dissertation, Emerging and Fresh Expressions of Church, how are they authentically Church and Anglican?.

Mobsby has founded several new monastic communities that include the Wellspring Community Peckham and the Moot Community, drawing heavily on a contemplative and sacramental basis to the Christian faith which seeks to promote a focus on following Jesus and in particular live out the marks of mission in how the community lives. Both the Wellspring Community and Moot Community have become leading new monastic communities in the UK.  In 2011 Mobsby was co-opted onto the Church of England's Advisory Council for the relations between Diocesan Bishops and Religious Communities to help this Anglican body discern a way forward to recognise New Monastic Communities as Acknowledged Religious Communities.

After a lengthy period of discernment Mobsby was the first elected Guardian of the newly constituted Society of the Holy Trinity, a new Society for the promotion of Anglican & Epsicopal missional new monastic communities in the UK and beyond.

Theology 
Mobsby has written about the Holy Trinity as the ultimate source of his theology and missiology. Phyllis Tickle stated:

Mobsby makes connections between God as an event of grace, and a happening to inform his understanding of God and God's salvific purposes for all people, as God seeks to restore all things back into right relationship with the divine.

Writing 
Mobsby has written and co-authored a number of books, and chapters in other edited books

Guidance on Church of England acknowledged religious communities

Ancient Faith Future Mission series
 Croft Steven, Mobsby Ian "Ancient Faith Future Mission: Fresh Expressions in the Sacramental Traditions", Norwich: Canterbury Press, 2008, New York: Church House Publishing, 2009.
 Cray Graham, Mobsby Ian "Ancient Faith Future Mission: New Monasticism as Fresh Expressions of Church", Norwich: Canterbury Press, 2010.
 Cray Graham, Mobsby Ian, Kennedy Aaron "Ancient Faith Future Mission: Fresh Expressions and the Kingdom of God", Norwich: Canterbury Press, 2012.
 Mobsby Ian, Potter Phil "Ancient Faith Future Mission: Doorways to the Sacred", Norwich: Canterbury Press, 2017.

Own research and writing
 Mobsby Ian Emerging and Fresh Expressions of Church. How are they Church and Anglican?, London: Moot Community Publishing, 2006.
 Mobsby Ian God Unknown.  The Trinity in contemporary spirituality and mission, Norwich: Canterbury Press: 2012.
 Kennedy Aaron, Mobsby Ian "The Rhythm of Life, Virtues, Postures and Practices.  A Proposal for the Moot Community", (London: Moot Community Publishing, 2008).

Chapters in other books
 Mobsby Ian "New Monastic Community in a Time of Environmental Crisis" in Bolger K Ryan "The Gospel after Christendom", (USA:Baker Academic, 2012).
 Mobsby Ian "Seeking in the City?" in Walker Andrew Kennedy Aaron "Discovering the Spirit in the City", (London: Continuum, 2010).

References

External links 
 Official website

20th-century English male writers
Alumni of Anglia Ruskin University
Living people
Year of birth missing (living people)
Alumni of York St John University
20th-century Anglican clergy
20th-century Anglican theologians